Domei is the name of:

 Dōmei Tsushin, former news agency in the Empire of Japan
 Japanese Confederation of Labour, former national trade union federation in Japan